Tomarctus is a canid genus of the extinct subfamily Borophaginae which inhabited most of North America during the late Early Miocene to the Early Barstovian age of the Middle Miocene (23—16 million years ago).

This animal shared a period and ecology with a variety of bear dogs, giant mustelid genera, and the genus of bone-crushing Canidae, Cynarctoides. As the bear dogs and giant mustelids became extinct, Tomarctus were a hyena-like fruit-eating canidae.

Species
The genus currently contains two accepted species, Tomarctus brevirostris and  Tomarctus hippophaga.

Tomarctus brevirostris, synonymous with Aelurodon francisi, was named by Edward Drinker Cope in 1873. Fossil specimens have been found as far south as Panama, east to Plum Point, Maryland, west to California, and north to Montana.

Tomarctus hippophaga was first described by Matthew and Cook in 1909 from the Trojan Quarry, Olcott Formation, Nebraska. Specimens have since been found as far west as California and as far north as the Montana/Alberta, Canada line.

References

Martin, L.D. 1989. Fossil history of the terrestrial carnivora. Pages 536 - 568 in J.L. Gittleman, editor. Carnivore Behavior, Ecology, and Evolution, Vol. 1. Comstock Publishing Associates: Ithaca.
Tedford, R.H. 1978. History of dogs and cats: A view from the fossil record. Pages 1 – 10 in Nutrition and Management of Dogs and Cats. Ralston Purina Co.: St. Louis.
- Bio One Data Base - Tomarctus

Borophagines
Miocene canids
Serravallian extinctions
Prehistoric mammals of North America
Prehistoric carnivoran genera
Burdigalian first appearances
Taxa named by Edward Drinker Cope
Fossil taxa described in 1873